The 44th Daytime Creative Arts Emmy Awards ceremony, which honors the crafts behind American daytime television programming, was held at the Pasadena Civic Auditorium in Pasadena, California on April 28, 2017. The event was presented in conjunction with the 44th Daytime Emmy Awards by the National Academy of Television Arts and Sciences. The nominations were announced on March 22, 2017, during a live episode of CBS's The Talk for the third year in a row. On January 26, 2017, it was announced that the Lifetime Achievement Award would be presented to Harry Friedman.

Category and rule changes
The National Academy of Television Arts and Sciences announced and implemented some category and rule changes for the 44th Daytime Emmy Awards, which include:

 The previous two performer categories related to Outstanding Digital Daytime Drama Series were replaced by four categories:
 Outstanding Lead Actress in a Digital Daytime Drama Series
 Outstanding Lead Actor in a Digital Daytime Drama Series
 Outstanding Supporting or Guest Actress in a Digital Daytime Drama Series
 Outstanding Supporting or Guest Actor in a Digital Daytime Drama Series
 New categories were added to recognize work on Preschool Animated Programs:
 Outstanding Directing in a Preschool Animated Program
  Outstanding Sound Mixing for a Preschool Animated Program
 Outstanding Sound Editing for a Preschool Animated Program
 The category Outstanding Musical Performance in a Talk Show/Morning Program was renamed Outstanding Musical Performance in a Daytime Program, now honoring any Daytime Program, not just talk shows or morning programs. 
 The category Outstanding Children's Series was renamed Outstanding Children's and Family Viewing Series.
Directors in the category of Outstanding Directing in a Talk Show/Entertainment News or Morning Program now have the ability to select up to 5 episodes from the 2016 calendar year, that has a total running time of 40 minutes to submit for evaluation.

Winners and nominees

Winners are listed first, highlighted in boldface, and indicated with a double dagger.

Programs

Performers

Crafts

Drama

Non-Drama

References

044 Creative Arts
2016 television awards
2016 in American television